Renat Favarisovich Davletyarov  (born August 17, 1961, Astrakhan, USSR) is a Russian film director, film producer and screenwriter. President of the Guild of Producers of Russia.

Best known as the creator of the films Steel Butterfly, The Dawns Here Are Quiet, and The Pilot. A Battle for Survival.

In 2014 he married the singer and actress, Reflex's  ex-soloist Yevgenia Malakhova (October 28, 1988). In 2019, the couple broke up.

References

External links

Living people
1961 births
People from Astrakhan
Tatar people of Russia
Russian film directors
Russian film producers
Russian screenwriters
Russian male actors